Banke District (a part of Lumbini Province, is one of the 77 districts of Nepal. There are three main cities in the Banke District: Nepalganj, Kohalpur and Khajura Bajaar.

Geography and Climate
Banke is bordered on the west by Bardiya district. Rapti zone's Salyan and Dang Deukhuri Districts border to the north and east. To the south lies Uttar Pradesh, India, a country in Asia; specifically Shravasti and Bahraich districts of Awadh.  East of Nepalganj the international border follows the southern edge of the Dudhwa Range of the Siwaliks.

Most of the district is drained by the Rapti, except the district's western edge is drained by the Babai.  Rapti and Babai cross into Uttar Pradesh, a state in India, Nepal's neighboring country and eventually join the Karnali, whose name has changed to Ghaghara.

Demographics
At the time of the 2011 Nepal census, Banke District had a population of 491,313. Of these, 39.0% spoke Nepali, 24.0% Awadhi, 18.7% Urdu, 14.4% Tharu, 1.0% Maithili, 0.9% Magar, 0.7% Hindi, 0.4% Newar, 0.3% Doteli, 0.1% Bhojpuri, 0.1% Gurung, 0.1% Tamang and 0.1% other languages as their first language.

In terms of ethnicity/caste, 19.2% were Musalman, 15.8% Tharu, 14.5% Chhetri, 6.5% Hill Brahmin, 5.7% Magar, 4.7% Kami, 4.7% Yadav, 3.6% Thakuri, 2.2% Kurmi, 1.9% Chamar/Harijan/Ram, 1.5% other Dalit, 1.5% Damai/Dholi, 1.3% Newar, 1.1% Dhobi, 1.0% Kathabaniyan, 1.0% Sanyasi/Dasnami, 1.0% other Terai, 0.9% Dusadh/Pasawan/Pasi, 0.9% Hajam/Thakur, 0.9% Kori, 0.8% Terai Brahmin, 0.8% Gurung, 0.8% Teli, 0.7% Kanu, 0.6% Kayastha, 0.5% Halwai, 0.4% Badhaee, 0.4% Kahar, 0.4% Sarki, 0.3% Gaderi/Bhedihar, 0.3% Koiri/Kushwaha, 0.3% Kumal, 0.3% Kumhar, 0.3% Mallaha, 0.3% Marwadi, 0.2% Bengali, 0.2% Chidimar, 0.2% Kalwar, 0.2% Kewat, 0.2% Lohar, 0.2% Sonar, 0.2% Tamang, 0.1% Badi, 0.1% Baraee, 0.1% Gaine, 0.1% Lodh, 0.1% Mali, 0.1% Musahar, 0.1% Pattharkatta/Kushwadiya, 0.1% Rai, 0.1% Rajbanshi, 0.1% Rajput and 0.1% others.

In terms of religion, 78.4% were Hindu, 19.0% Muslim, 1.3% Christian, 1.1% Buddhist and 0.1% others.

In terms of literacy, 61.9% could read and write, 2.6% could only read and 35.4% could neither read nor write.

Sub- Metropolitan City, Municipality and Rural Municipalities
There are one Sub-metropolitan city, one Municipality and six Rural Municipalities in Banke District.
 Nepalgunj Sub-Metropolitan City
 Kohalpur Municipality
 Rapti-Sonari Rural Municipality
 Narainapur Rural Municipality
 Duduwa Rural Municipality
 Janaki Rural Municipality
 Khajura Rural Municipality
 Baijanath Rural Municipality

Former VDCs and Municipalities

Bageswari
Bashudevpur
Baijapur
Belahari
Belbhar
Betahani
Bhawaniyapur
Binauna
Chisapani
Ganapur
Gangapur
Hirminiya
Holiya
Indrapur
Jaispur
Kalaphanta
Kamdi
Kanchanapur
Kathkuiya
Khajura Khurda
Khaskarkado
Khaskusma
Kohalpur
Laksmanpur
Mahadevpuri
Manikapur
Matahiya
Narainapur
Naubasta
Nepalganj
Parsapur
Phatepur
Piparhawa
Puraina
Puraini
Radhapur
Rajhena
Raniyapur
Saigaun
Samserganj
Sitapur
Sonapur
Titahiriya
Udarapur
Udayapur

See also
Zones of Nepal

References

 
Districts of Nepal established during Rana regime or before